Basgo Monastery, also known as Basgo or Bazgo Gompa, is a Buddhist monastery located in Basgo or Bazgo in Leh District, Ladakh, northern India approximately 40 km from Leh.

Although the monastery was built for the Namgyal rulers in 1680, Bazgo itself was embedded in the early days of Ladakh and is frequently mentioned in the Ladakhi Chronicles when it was a political and cultural center.  In the 15th century, a palace was built in Basgo. 

The monastery is situated on top of the hill towering over the ruins of the ancient town and is noted for its Buddha statue and murals. The complex comprises the Chamchung, Chamba Lakhang, and Serzang temples, dedicated to the Maitreya Buddha.

Footnotes

External links
Flickr photos tagged with Basgo

Buddhist monasteries in Ladakh
Gelug monasteries
Tibetan Buddhist monasteries and temples in India